Zapotec or zapoteca may refer to:

Cultures and languages
 Zapotec civilization, a historical indigenous pre-Columbian civilization and archaeological culture of central Mexico
 Zapotec languages, a group of closely related indigenous Mesoamerican languages
 Zapotec peoples, contemporary indigenous peoples of Mexico
 Zapotecan languages, a group of related Oto-Manguan languages (including Zapotec languages), of central Mesoamerica

Other uses
 Zapoteca (plant), a legume genus

See also
Emil Zátopek, athlete
Zátopek (film), film
Lukáš Zátopek, Czech ice hockey player

Language and nationality disambiguation pages